Kelvin Templeton (born 30 September 1956) is a former Australian rules footballer. At sixteen years of age Templeton kicked 100 goals for Traralgon in the 1973 Latrobe Valley Football League season.

Footscray, within whose country zone Traralgon was located, eyed Templeton continuously from that point, and he joined the club for the 1974 season at a time when the club had been desperately short of matchwinning goalkickers ever since Jack Collins retired in the 1950s. His debut against Collingwood was a sensation, for Templeton kicked six goals at full-forward. In 1976, Templeton kicked 82 goals, with a best of seven against South Melbourne.

After an injury-ruined 1977, Templeton came back to head the goalkicking table for 1978 with 118, including a career-best performance of 15 goals against St Kilda on 1 July. During this match Templeton set a record of 24 scoring shots (15 goals, nine behinds). Footscray kicked a then-record score of 33 goals fifteen behinds (213 points) in this match and his combined total with Ian Dunstan of 22 goals is a record for two players on one side in a VFL/AFL match. Despite this phenomenal feat, Footscray finished eleventh of twelve teams with only six other wins for the year.

Templeton was the league's leading goalkicker for the second consecutive year but after an appalling start to the 1980 season with eleven consecutive losses coach Royce Hart moved Templeton to centre half-forward in order to bring him closer to the action. The move worked so well that Templeton became the first forward to win the Brownlow Medal and still kicked over seventy goals.

In 1981, however, Templeton could play only six games due to a serious knee injury, and nagging injuries reduced his effectiveness during his last year with Footscray in 1982. Melbourne bought Templeton as part of a buying spree for 1983 but the injuries did not abate and he played only 34 games for the Demons before announcing his retirement in April 1986.

Later, he would become the CEO of the Sydney Swans as they started to become a power in the Australian Football League.

In 1980 Templeton covered the song "Who's Sorry Now" for the album Footy Favourites – a collection of songs sung by VFL players.

Statistics

|-
|- style="background-color: #EAEAEA"
! scope="row" style="text-align:center" | 1974
|style="text-align:center;"|
| 31 || 12 || 25 || 18 || 92 || 14 || 106 || 54 ||  || 2.1 || 1.5 || 7.7 || 1.2 || 8.8 || 4.5 || 
|-
! scope="row" style="text-align:center" | 1975
|style="text-align:center;"|
| 31 || 14 || 29 || 18 || 92 || 19 || 111 || 62 ||  || 2.1 || 1.4 || 7.1 || 1.5 || 8.5 || 4.8 || 
|- style="background-color: #EAEAEA"
! scope="row" style="text-align:center" | 1976
|style="text-align:center;"|
| 31 || 23 || 82 || 39 || 201 || 14 || 215 || 117 ||  || 3.6 || 1.7 || 8.7 || 0.6 || 9.3 || 5.1 || 
|-
! scope="row" style="text-align:center" | 1977
|style="text-align:center;"|
| 31 || 9 || 40 || 19 || 84 || 9 || 93 || 46 ||  || 4.4 || 2.4 || 9.3 || 1.0 || 10.3 || 5.1 || 
|- style="background-color: #EAEAEA"
! scope="row" style="text-align:center" | 1978
|style="text-align:center;"|
| 31 || 21 || bgcolor="DD6E81"| 118 || bgcolor="DD6E81"| 65 || 253 || 27 || 280 || 176 ||  || bgcolor="DD6E81"| 5.6 || bgcolor="DD6E81"| 3.1 || 12.0 || 1.3 || 13.3 || 8.4 || 
|-
! scope="row" style="text-align:center" | 1979
|style="text-align:center;"|
| 31 || 22 || bgcolor="DD6E81"| 91 || bgcolor="DD6E81"| 62 || 238 || 27 || 265 || 150 ||  || 4.1 || bgcolor="DD6E81"| 2.8 || 10.8 || 1.2 || 12.0 || 6.8 || 
|- style="background-color: #EAEAEA"
! scope="row" style="text-align:center" | 1980
|style="text-align:center;"|
| 31 || 22 || 75 || 33 || 329 || 84 || 413 || 188 ||  || 3.4 || 1.5 || 15.0 || 3.8 || 18.8 || 8.5 || 
|-
! scope="row" style="text-align:center" | 1981
|style="text-align:center;"|
| 31 || 6 || 8 || 7 || 68 || 28 || 96 || 45 ||  || 1.3 || 1.2 || 11.3 || 4.7 || 16.0 || 7.5 || 
|- style="background-color: #EAEAEA"
! scope="row" style="text-align:center" | 1982
|style="text-align:center;"|
| 31 || 14 || 26 || 21 || 170 || 61 || 231 || 98 ||  || 1.9 || 1.5 || 12.1 || 4.4 || 16.5 || 7.0 || 
|-
! scope="row" style="text-align:center" | 1983
|style="text-align:center;"|
| 31 || 13 || 38 || 29 || 104 || 20 || 124 || 68 ||  || 2.9 || 2.2 || 8.0 || 1.5 || 9.5 || 5.2 || 
|- style="background-color: #EAEAEA"
! scope="row" style="text-align:center" | 1984
|style="text-align:center;"|
| 31 || 16 || 51 || 19 || 103 || 14 || 117 || 69 ||  || 3.2 || 1.2 || 6.4 || 0.9 || 7.3 || 4.3 || 
|-
! scope="row" style="text-align:center" | 1985
|style="text-align:center;"|
| 31 || 5 || 10 || 5 || 24 || 7 || 31 || 16 ||  || 2.0 || 1.0 || 4.8 || 1.4 || 6.2 || 3.2 || 
|- class="sortbottom"
! colspan=3| Career
! 177
! 593
! 335
! 1758
! 324
! 2082
! 1089
! 
! 3.4
! 1.9
! 10.0
! 1.8
! 11.8
! 6.2
! 
|}

References

External links

1956 births
Living people
Western Bulldogs players
Melbourne Football Club players
Coleman Medal winners
Brownlow Medal winners
Victorian State of Origin players
Charles Sutton Medal winners
Recipients of the Australian Sports Medal
Traralgon Football Club players
Australian rules footballers from Victoria (Australia)
People from Traralgon